Jean Trémoulet (12 April 1909 – 13 October 1944) was a French racing driver who won the 1938 24 Hours of Le Mans with Eugène Chaboud. He died at 35 years old, as part of the French Resistance during World War II.

Racing record

Complete 24 Hours of Le Mans results

References

1909 births
1944 deaths
French racing drivers
24 Hours of Le Mans winning drivers
French Resistance members
Resistance members killed by Nazi Germany
French civilians killed in World War II